Zarqa is a 1969 Pakistani epic historical drama film directed, produced and written by Riaz Shahid while the music is composed by Rashid Attre and Wajahat Attre. It features Neelo, Alauddin, Ejaz Durrani, Saqi and Nasira as protagonist characters. It is based on the life of Zarqa, a Palestinian dancer girl and a freedom activist, the latter of whom killed herself for the liberation of Palestine involving Israeli-occupied territories and Palestinian liberation movement. It also addresses a real event of Neelo when she was forcibly invited by Nawab Malik Amir Mohammad Khan, the governor of West Pakistan to his office to perform a stage dance during the 1965's official visit of Mohammad Reza Pahlavi to Pakistan.

It was termed as a propaganda film at that time, primarily due to its depiction of the Palestinian freedom of movement, and lately when it was attempted to distribute it in Middle East through a guerilla organisation of the Palestine. In 2002, the film was featured in British Film Institute's poll (both critics and viewers' polls) of "Top Ten Pakistani Films of all times".

Release
The film was released on October 17, 1969. In 2017, the Lok Virsa Museum, dedicated to keep historical film records screened the film. It is recognized as the first diamond jubilee film in the history of Pakistani cinema. Primarily known for music blockbuster lyrics from the poems of Habib Jalib, Zarqa filmmakers have reportedly introduced a "propaganda-laden" story in the film. By the latter, the film director made controversial attempts when he offered film distribution of Zarqa for the Middle East through Al Fatah, a guerrilla organisation of Palestinian.

Plot 
The film revolves around an Arabian dancer girl Zarqa who joins Palestinian Liberation Organization and commits suicide aimed at to harm Israeli Army deployed in the State of Palestine. Film story starts with an old man who addresses a public gathering in 1969 and a group of Palestinian people listens to his story about a woman, Zarqa while a Palestinian leader Shabaan Lutfi recruits the people to the resistance movement.

Cast 
 Neelo as Zarqa
 Talish as Major David
 Alauddin as Shabaan Lutfi
 Ejaz
 Nasira
 Saqi
 ChhamChham
 Zulfi
 Fomi
 Ijaz Akhtar
 Kemal Irani
 Fazal Haq
 M.D. Sheikh
 Taya Barkat
 Raj Multani
 Hamid

Soundtrack 

 A Gham-e-Jahan Naach, Khalq-e-BeZaban Naach, Naach, Naach, Naach... Singer(s): Mala, Munir Hussain
 Azadi Ki Roshani Lo... Singer(s): Munir Hussain, Mala
 Hamen Yaqeen Hay, Dhalay Gi Ik Din.. A Falastine... Singer(s): Munir Hussain, Naseem Begum & Co.
 Jalti Aag Ko Shama Bana Kar Raqs Karay Parwana... Singer(s): Munir Hussain, Mala & Co.
 Main Phool Baichnay Ayi, Main Tor Kay Bulbul Ka Dil... Singer(s): Naseem Begum
 Raqs, Zanjeer Pehan Kar Bhi Kiya Jata Hay... Singer(s): Mehdi Hassan
 Ya Abbi, Ya Rafiq.. Qais Hay Tu, Tu Hay Sehra, Tu Hay Mehmal... Singer(s): Naseem Begum & Co.
 Ya Zarqa.. Mera Dil Tha BeQarar, Tha Tumhara Intezar... Singer(s): Munir Hussain, Naseem Begum

Awards and recognition
Nigar Awards in 1969 for 'Best Film', 'Best Director', 'Best Script', 'Best Actress', 'Best Lyrics' and 'Best Male Singer'.

References

Notes

External links 
 

1969 films
1960s Urdu-language films
1960s historical drama films
Films scored by Rashid Attre
Pakistani historical drama films
Films set in Pakistan
Films shot in Pakistan
Epic films based on actual events
Pakistani epic films
Drama films based on actual events
Israeli–Palestinian conflict films
Nigar Award winners
Urdu-language Pakistani films